Crowfoot Mountain is a mountain within Banff National Park in Alberta, Canada. The Crowfoot Glacier sits on the northeastern flank of the mountain.

The mountain was named in 1959 after the glacier.

Geology

Like other mountains in Banff Park, Crowfoot Mountain is composed of sedimentary rock laid down during the Precambrian to Jurassic periods. Formed in shallow seas, this sedimentary rock was pushed east and over the top of younger rock during the Laramide orogeny.

Climate

Based on the Köppen climate classification, Crowfoot Mountain is located in a subarctic climate with cold, snowy winters, and mild summers. Temperatures can drop below −20 C with wind chill factors below −30 C. Precipitation runoff from Crowfoot Mountain drains into the Bow River which is a tributary of the Saskatchewan River.

See also
List of mountains of Canada

References

External links 

 Parks Canada web site: Banff National Park

Three-thousanders of Alberta
Mountains of Banff National Park